The flag of the Republic of the Rio Grande was used in 1840, during 283 days from January 17 to November 6, as long as the republic existed. This country was formed by the northeastern Mexican states of Coahuila, Nuevo León, and Tamaulipas. The flag was no longer used following the defeat of the Republic of the Rio Grande by Mexican troops.

The flag of the Republic of the Rio Grande has a blue hoist with three white stars run evenly along the hoist. The three stars represent the three states that seceded: Coahuila, Nuevo León, and Tamaulipas. The fly is split into three bands, one white, one red, and one black. It was designed to be similar to the Flag of Texas, as the Republic of the Rio Grande was fighting for the same ideals as the Republic of Texas was.

Flag of Laredo

The city of Laredo, Texas uses a derivative of this flag, commonly thought to be the flag of the Republic of the Rio Grande, as its city flag, while also incorporating it and the six flags over the rest of Texas on its city coat of arms. However, due to a local historian's error in the 1930s, the modern Laredo flag is not quite identical in design to the actual historical flag of the Republic of the Rio Grande. Laredo had served as the capital of the brief republic, and in the present day is known as "The City Under Seven Flags".

See also 

 Flag of Texas
 Flag of Mexico

References 

Flags introduced in 1840
Historical flags
Flags of Texas
Independent Mexico
Mexican Texas
Flag